Scott Brian Banks (born 26 September 2001) is a Scottish footballer who plays as an attacking midfielder for League Two club Bradford City, on loan from Crystal Palace. He is a member of the Scotland under-21 team. Banks began his career in Scotland with Dundee United, and has also played for Clyde, Alloa Athletic and Dunfermline Athletic on loan. He made his debut for Scotland under-21s in 2021.

Early life
Banks comes from Linlithgow, West Lothian, and attended the Scottish Football Association performance school at Graeme High School in Falkirk.

Club career
Banks joined Dundee United at youth level from Linlithgow Rose Boys Club in 2013. After being top scorer for the United under-17 team the previous season, he signed his first professional contract with the club in 2018.

In February 2019, Banks joined League Two club Clyde on loan for the rest of the 2018–19 season, quickly becoming a "fans' favourite". He scored the club's goal of the season against Peterhead and was man of the match against Annan Athletic in the match that secured Clyde's promotion from League Two.

After impressing manager Robbie Neilson in pre-season matches, Banks made his Dundee United debut as a substitute against Heart of Midlothian in the Scottish League Cup in July 2019. The following month, United reportedly turned down a £400,000 transfer bid for Banks from Premier League club Crystal Palace. Following this, Banks rejected a new contract offer from Dundee United and was left out of the squad by Neilson.

In January 2020, he signed a three year contract with Crystal Palace. Later in January, Palace loaned Banks to Alloa Athletic until the end of the 2019–20 season.

In January 2021, Banks was signed on a loan deal by Scottish Championship side Dunfermline Athletic until the end of the 2020–21 Season.

On 8 August 2022, Banks joined EFL League Two club Bradford City on a season-long loan.

International career
Banks made two appearances for the Scotland under-19 team, both in friendly matches against Japan played in Pinatar, Spain, during September 2019. He was called up to the under-21 squad for the first time in 2021, for two friendly matches against Northern Ireland at the Dumbarton Football Stadium. He made his debut at under-21 international in the first match, a 2–1 win for Scotland.

Prior to being called up for Scotland under-21s, Banks had held talks with Wales under-21 coach Paul Bodin with a view to joining their squad, as he is also eligible to represent Wales.

Career statistics

References

2001 births
Living people
People from Linlithgow
Footballers from West Lothian
People educated at Graeme High School
Scottish footballers
Association football midfielders
Dundee United F.C. players
Clyde F.C. players
Crystal Palace F.C. players
Scottish Professional Football League players
Alloa Athletic F.C. players
Dunfermline Athletic F.C. players
Bradford City A.F.C. players
Scotland under-21 international footballers